Maryland Route 288 (MD 288) is a state highway in the U.S. state of Maryland. Known as Crosby Road, the highway runs  from MD 20 near Rock Hall east to Long Cove Public Landing on the Piney Neck peninsula near Crosby in western Kent County. MD 288 was constructed in the mid-1920s and resurfaced in the mid-1960s.

Route description

MD 288 begins at an intersection with MD 20 (Rock Hall Road) just east of the town of Rock Hall. The two-lane undivided highway heads south along Piney Neck between Grays Inn Creek to the west and Langford Creek to the east. At Skinners Neck Road, MD 288 turns east and then south again at Edesville Road. The highway turns east again in the hamlet of Crosby while Piney Neck Road continues south. MD 288 veers south while McKinleyville Road continues southeast. The highway reaches its eastern terminus at Long Cove Public Landing on Long Cove, an inlet of Langford Creek just north of where the creek empties into the Chester River.

History
MD 288 was constructed as a  concrete road from Coleman's Corner on the Rock Hall–Chestertown road (present-day MD 20) to Crouch's Wharf on Piney Neck in 1925 and 1926. MD 288 was resurfaced with bituminous concrete in 1965.

Junction list

See also

References

External links

MDRoads: MD 288

288
Maryland Route 288